
Gmina Lasowice Wielkie, German Gemeinde Gross Lassowitz is a rural gmina (administrative district) in Kluczbork County, Opole Voivodeship, in south-western Poland.

Since 2006 the commune, like much of the area, has been bilingual in German and Polish.

The gmina contains part of the protected area called Stobrawa Landscape Park.

Administrative divisions
The commune contains the villages and settlements of:

Lasowice Wielkie
Chocianowice
Chudoba
Ciarka
Gronowice
Jasienie
Laskowice
Lasowice Małe
Oś
Szumirad
Trzebiszyn
Tuły
Wędrynia

Neighbouring gminas
Gmina Lasowice Wielkie is bordered by the gminas of Kluczbork, Łubniany, Murów, Olesno, Turawa and Zębowice.

References

Lasowice Wielkie
Kluczbork County
Bilingual communes in Poland